The 2016 Exeter Sevens is the second tournament of the 2016 Sevens Grand Prix Series. It will be held over the weekend of 9–10 July 2016.

Teams
12 teams participated in the tournament. In preparation for the 2016 Olympics, instead of England, Scotland, and Wales fielding individual teams, two unified Great Britain teams will compete.

 
 
 
 
  Royals
  Lions

Pool Stage

Pool A

Pool B

Pool C

Knockout stage

Bowl

Plate

Cup

References

2016
2016–17 in English rugby union
Grand Prix 2